Robertstown is a town in South Australia. Robertstown is named for the John Roberts, the first postmaster in the area, who laid out the town in 1871. It was previously known as Emu Flats and Roberts Town.

Robertstown is the hub of a small broadacre farming community. The town is host to the Robertstown Hotel, Lehmann's General Store and Tschirn's Mechanical which does vehicle repairs and sells fuel.

Transport
Robertstown is on the Worlds End Highway between Eudunda and Burra.  It was also previously the terminus of the Robertstown railway line from Eudunda and Adelaide, which operated between 1914  and 1990.

Mining
The Robertstown area has been host to several asbestos mines.

Motorsport
The Robertstown area is the venue for many motoring events.

An event in the annual South Australian Troy series motor cycle enduro is also conducted in August in the ranges near Robertstown.

References

Towns in South Australia